is a manga series by , published by Kadokawa, portraying Isabella Bird's exploration of Japan. It is serialized in the magazine Harta.

In May 2015 Kadokawa published the first tankōbon, and in 2018 it began publishing, within Japan, a bilingual Japanese-English version of the comic intended for Japanese people studying English. The bilingual version places the original Japanese text in the page margins with new English text taking its place. The bilingual comic volumes include a column from British journalist Ryohei Kawai ( Kawai Ryōhei) and an interview with the author. Kadokawa also publishes the manga in Taiwan. The company Éditions Ki-oon publishes the manga in France, as Isabella Bird, femme exploratrice.

Characters
 Isabella Bird ( Isabera Bādo)
  ( Itō Tsurukichi) – Bird's translator and guide
 James Hepburn ( Jēmusu Hebon) – He helps Bird find a translator
 Sir Harry Parkes ( Harī Pākusu) – The British Consul to Japan, he helps Bird get the travel documents needed for her journey
 Fanny Parkes ( Fanī Pākusu) – Harry Parkes's wife

See also
 Unbeaten Tracks in Japan – Isabella Bird's travel diary

References

External links
 ふしぎの国のバード – Comic Walker, Kadokawa 
 

2015 manga
Enterbrain manga
Seinen manga
Historical anime and manga